The 2011 Pirelli World Challenge season was the 22nd season of the Sports Car Club of America's World Challenge series. It was the first season under the Pirelli sponsorship.  Championships were awarded in three classes: GT, GTS, and Touring.  The season began at St. Petersburg, Florida, on March 26 ended after 12 rounds at Road Atlanta on September 30.  All rounds were covered on television by Versus.

Schedule
Part of the schedule was released December 1, 2010.  The final two rounds were announced February 2, 2011. Watkins Glen, Exhibition Place, and Virginia International Raceway were not retained. Infineon Raceway returned to the schedule after a five-year absence. Laguna Seca and Road Atlanta returned after a one-year absence.

News
On January 3, 2011, Cadillac announced their return to the series after a four-year absence.

Pirelli became the sole tire supplier for the 2011 season.  The series used slick racing tires, rather than the street-legal treaded tires used in previous seasons.

Brimtek Motorsports announced that they would be fielding a Volkswagen GTI in the touring car class for 2011.

It was announced that Mike Skeen would be driving a Chevrolet Corvette for CRP Motorsports in the GT class.

Results

References

External links
World Challenge Official Website

Pirelli World Challenge season
GT World Challenge America